Garfield Shaw is a retired Jamaican association football striker who played professionally in the USISL.

Shaw spent some of the 1995 Continental Indoor Soccer League season with the Washington Warthogs.   In February 1996, the Los Angeles selected Shaw in the fifteenth round (144 overall) of the 1996 MLS Inaugural Player Draft.  The Galaxy released him on April 17, 1996  On April 6, 1998, he signed with the Minnesota Thunder of the USISL A-League.  On February 18, 1999, the Thunder released Shaw.  In 1999, he played for the Maryland Mania.  In 2010, he played for the Maryland Tigers in the PASL.

References

1972 births
Living people
Jamaican footballers
Jamaican expatriate footballers
Maryland Mania players
Minnesota Thunder players
USISL players
Association football forwards
Association football midfielders